Diary of a Sex Addict is a 2001 drama film directed by Joseph Brutsman and co-written by Anthony Peck, son of Gregory Peck. It premiered at the Venice Film Festival in August 2001.

Plot
A middle-aged chef in a luxurious restaurant reveals to his psychiatrist that while he is a family man who loves his wife and son, he is at the same time a sex addict who seeks pleasure at any time with any woman.

Cast
 Rosanna Arquette as Grace
 Michael Des Barres as Sammy
 Nastassja Kinski as Dr. Jane, The Therapist
 Eva Jenickova as Tatiana
 Cole Sprouse and Dylan Sprouse as Sammy Jr.
 Ed Begley Jr. as Dr. Aaron
 Alexandra Paul as Katherine, Grace's Sister
 A. J. Benza as Detective Shore
 Joey House as Tawney
 Anna de Cardi as Heather
 Maria del Mar as Vita
 Heidi Jo Markel as Kelly May
 Adrienne Janic as Julie
 Troy Winbush as Ordell
 T. C. Warner as Ms. Storm
 Tangie Ambrose as "Suga"
 Simona Williams as Leslie Anderson
 Rachelle Carson-Begley as Sophie
 Daniella Rich as Marina
 Terri Apple as Sue
 Shirly Brener as Angel
 Shannan Leigh as Cathy, The Prostitute
 Jimmy Flynt as Tom, The Cook
 Aviva Gale as Veronica, The Cook
 Nancy Linehan Charles as Sammy's Mother
 M. C. Gainey as Theatre Manager
 Kevin Kirkpatrick as The Bartender
 Shea Curry as Dream Girl (uncredited)

References

External links

2001 films
2001 drama films
Films about sex addiction
American drama films
2000s English-language films
2000s American films
English-language drama films